Jalwa is a Pakistani music television channel, on air since 2013. Jalwa airs all types of music, old and new, Bollywood and Lollywood songs. It launched after the 8XM Pakistani music channel.

See also 
 List of music channels in Pakistan

References 

Music television channels
Television stations in Pakistan